"Dominique" is a 1963 French language popular song, written and performed by the Belgian female singer Jeannine Deckers, better known as Sœur Sourire ("Sister Smile" in French) or The Singing Nun. The song is about Saint Dominic, a Spanish-born priest and founder of the Dominican Order, of which she was a member (as Sister Luc-Gabrielle). The English-version lyrics of the song were written by Noël Regney. In addition to French and English, Deckers recorded versions in Dutch, German, Hebrew, Japanese, Korean, and Portuguese.

It was a top selling record in 11 countries in late 1963 and early 1964.

Commercial performance

"Dominique" reached the Top 10 in 11 countries in late 1963 and early 1964, topping the chart in the United States, Canada, Australia and New Zealand. It reached the Top 5 in Norway, Denmark, Ireland and South Africa, with the song making it into the lower reaches of the Top 10 in the Netherlands, West Germany, and the United Kingdom. The song reached and stayed at No. 1 on Top 40 radio station WABC in New York City for the four weeks of 19 November through 10 December.  On WLS Chicago, the song was No. 1 for the three weeks 15–29 November 1963.  On both the U.S. Billboard Hot 100 and "Easy Listening chart", "Dominique" was No. 1 for the four weeks 7–28 December 1963.

The song won the Grammy Award for Best Gospel or Other Religious Recording (Musical) in 1964. It was also a nominee for Grammy Award for Record of the Year, and Sœur Sourire was a nominee for Best Female Vocal Performance. It was the second foreign language song to hit No. 1 on the Hot 100 in 1963, the first being "Sukiyaki" by Kyu Sakamoto. For the next ten years or so, although there were a number of hits with most of the vocals in a language other than English (e.g., The Sandpipers' "Guantanamera", René y René's "Lo Mucho Que Te Quiero", etc.), no other purely foreign language song reached the Billboard Hot 100's top 40 until the Spanish language hit "Eres tú (Touch The Wind)" in 1974. "Dominique" outsold Elvis Presley during its stay on the Billboard Hot 100; it was the second to last No. 1 hit before the British Invasion.

The song
"Dominique" became a worldwide hit in 1963 and was the first, and only, Belgian number-one hit single in the American Billboard charts.

It is remembered chiefly for its refrain, which goes:
 Domi-nique -nique -nique s'en allait tout simplement,
 Routier, pauvre et chantant.
 En tous chemins, en tous lieux,
 Il ne parle que du Bon Dieu, Il ne parle que du Bon Dieu.A literal English translation is:
 Domi-nic -nic -nic went about simply, a poor singing traveller. On every road, in every place, he talks only of the Good Lord, he talks only of the Good Lord.The lyrics of the chorus of Regney's English-language translation are:
 Domi-nique -nique -nique, o'er the land he plods along, And sings a little song. Never asking for reward, He just talks about the Lord, He just talks about the Lord.Chart history

Weekly charts

Year-end charts

All-time charts

Cover versions
 Mary Ford recorded an English-language version that was released in November 1963 by Calendar Records.
 Sister Adele (a.k.a. Madelaine) also recorded a cover version of the song in 1963, which was released on Diplomat Records. 
 The Cuban artist La Lupe, the Mexican artist Angélica María, the Colombian artist Aníbal Velázquez and the Venezuelan artist Mirla Castellanos recorded Spanish language versions of this song.
 The Brazilian singer Giane recorded a Brazilian Portuguese version of this song.
 Spike Jones recorded a version that combined "Dominique" with "When the Saints Go Marching In", merging both the melodies and the styles of the two songs. 
 A variation including "When the Saints Go Marching In" is the Regimental March of the 5th Battalion of the Royal Australian Regiment.
 Tommy Roe recorded an English version of the song for his U.S. album release, "Something for Everybody" in 1964. 
 Sandler and Young revived the song in late 1966, a version that appeared on the Billboard easy listening chart. The performance was a medley including other religious-themed songs including "Deep River" and "Nobody Knows the Trouble I've Seen".
 The Czech singer Judita Čeřovská covered this song in 1964 under the name "Dominiku".

Soundtrack appearances
 In the 1966 film The Singing Nun, very loosely based on Deckers, Debbie Reynolds, playing the title role, sings an English-language version of the song (with different lyrics from those of Deckers' English-language version).
 The song is heard in the 1985 film Heaven Help Us.
 In the 1987 Married... with Children episode "Thinnergy", "Dominique" is one of several songs Peg (Katey Sagal) sings in an attempt to annoy Al (Ed O'Neill).
 It was used in the 1990 film Mermaids with Cher.
 It was used in the 1993 film as elevator music For Love or Money with Michael J Fox.
 The song was referenced in The Simpsons episode "Bart's Friend Falls in Love" (1992), where Milhouse van Houten visits his girlfriend in an all-girls convent school. A nun playing guitar and singing "Dominique" passes along, followed by several equally happy little girls. The nun's character voice was provided by cast member Maggie Roswell, who knew none of the song's actual French lyrics and instead made up her own.
 In 1999, it was sung in Everybody Loves Raymond by Robert and Raymond when they learn Debra's sister is becoming a nun.
 The song also featured in an episode of Welsh sitcom High Hopes.
 In 2009, the song was used in the third series premiere of British teen drama Skins.
 In 2009, it was also used in Mad Men in the episode "The Color Blue", when Don Draper walks into Suzanne Farell's apartment for the second time. 
 In 2012, the song is featured prominently in US anthology series American Horror Story: Asylum, the events of which take place in 1964. The original Belgian French version of the song is playing over and over in the common room of the insane asylum, and the inmates are punished if they disrupt or stop the song from playing. The record for the song is smashed by then inmate Judy Martin in a later episode stopping its constant play, the song is briefly mentioned by Sister Mary Eunice in the episode "The Name Game" when she recapped the event of Judy destroying it right as she reveals the new jukebox she has bought for Briarcliff Aslyum.
 In season 2 of episode 20 (titled 'Rock n Roll Fantasy') of Just the Ten of Us, it is sung by Heather Langenkamp, who played Marie Lubbock. It originally aired 28 April 1989.
 In the season 3 episode of the science fiction series Dark Matter, entitled "All the Time in the World", it is sung by Anthony Lemke and Zoie Palmer. Lemke, who is fully bilingual, plays a character who is caught in a time loop similar to "Groundhog Day" and spends his time learning French from the spaceship's android.
 In 2019, the song appears at the beginning of first episode of season two of Happy!, the Syfy and Netflix Series.

Samples
 The musician Poe used a sample of the song in her album Haunted,'' on the track "House of Leaves".
 The anonymous Australian rock band TISM sampled the song in the chorus to their 1998 song "I Might Be a Cunt, But I'm Not a Fucking Cunt".

See also
 List of 1960s one-hit wonders in the United States

References

External links
 "Dominique" lyrics in English and French Allthelyrics.com
 The lyrics in full 
 

1963 singles
Billboard Hot 100 number-one singles
Cashbox number-one singles
Number-one singles in Argentina
Number-one singles in Australia
Number-one singles in Canada
Number-one singles in New Zealand
Number-one singles in South Africa
Number-one singles in Venezuela
Soeur Sourire songs
Songs written by Noël Regney
French-language songs
Philips Records singles
1963 songs
Number-one singles in Mexico